Erna Rosenstein (17 May 1913 – 10 November 2004) was a surrealist painter and poet.

Biography

She was the daughter of an Austrian-Jewish judge and Ukrainian mom. She was born in the town of Lemberg, Austria-Hungary. 

In 1918 they moved to Kraków. In November 1918 Poland regained its independence as the Second Polish Republic. Her father wanted her to take up in the family business of law.

Her works were evoked by her experiences as a Jew in Nazi-occupied Poland. She and her parents went to Warsaw, but her parents were murdered by a Polish bandit, while they were trying to find a safe place. She was severely wounded in the attack, but survived.

After the war she was confronted with the reality of Communism. Having idealized it earlier, she ran into conflict with it.  In later life Rosenstein published a book of her memoirs and several volumes of poetry.

Rosenstein's brother, the Austrian professor Paul N. Rosenstein-Rodan went on to become a Boston University professor and economist.  He coined the term "underdeveloped countries". She was married to Polish-Jewish literary critic Artur Sandauer.

She died of arterial sclerosis in 2004.

External links

Erna Rosenstein Bio
Obituary from the Los Angeles Times

1913 births
2004 deaths
20th-century Polish painters
Jewish women painters
Jewish painters
Polish surrealist artists
Polish contemporary artists
Women surrealist artists
Polish women painters
Jews from Galicia (Eastern Europe)
Artists from Kraków
Polish communists
Burials at Powązki Military Cemetery
Surrealist artists
20th-century Polish women
Polish people of Austrian-Jewish descent
Polish people of Ukrainian-Jewish descent